Sammut is a surname. Notable people with the surname include:

 Antoinette Cini (née Sammut; born 1993), Maltese former footballer
 Carmen Sammut, Maltese Catholic sister
 Carmen Sammut (professor) (born 1966), Maltese professor
 Claude Sammut, Australian computer scientist
 Frans Sammut (1945–2011), Maltese novelist
 Jarrod Sammut (born 1987), Maltese rugby league player
 Kevin Sammut (born 1981), Maltese professional footballer
 Mark Anthony Sammut (born 1986), Maltese politician 
 Ruben Sammut (born 1997), English professional footballer

See also
 Robyn Denholm (born 1963), Australian executive and chairman of Tesla
 Robert Samut (1869–1934), Maltese doctor

Maltese-language surnames